New York's 15th State Senate district is one of 63 districts in the New York State Senate. It has been represented by Democrat Joseph Addabbo Jr. since 2009, following his defeat of longtime Republican incumbent Serphin Maltese.

Geography
District 15 covers a large swath of central and southeastern Queens, including the neighborhoods of Howard Beach, Ozone Park, Woodhaven, Glendale, Middle Village, and Maspeth, as well as parts of South Ozone Park, Ridgewood, Woodside and The Rockaways.

The district overlaps with New York's 5th, 6th, 7th, 8th, 12th, and 14th congressional districts, and with the  23rd, 25th, 27th, 28th, 30th, 31st, 34th, 37th, 38th, and 39th districts of the New York State Assembly.

Recent election results

2020

2018

2016

2014

2012

Federal results in District 15

References

15